The  was the sixth season of the Japan Football League, the third tier of the Japanese football league system.

Overview 

It was contested by 16 teams, and Otsuka Pharmaceuticals won the championship.

Table

Results

Top scorers

Attendances

Promotion and relegation 
Because of promotion of Otsuka Pharmaceuticals and Thespa Kusatsu and expulsion of Kokushikan University, no relegation has occurred. After the season, Honda Lock, Mitsubishi Motors Mizushima and Ryutsu Keizai University were promoted from Regional Leagues by the virtue of their placing in the Regional League promotion series.

References 

2004
3